Brousseau is a French surname. It can refer to the following people:

 Alfred Brousseau (1907 – 1988), American educator, photographer and mathematician
 Caleb Brousseau (born 1988), Canadian para-alpine skier
 Gino Brousseau (born 1966), Canadian volleyball player
 Jean-Baptiste Brousseau (1841 – 1925), Canadian lawyer, journalist and political figure in Quebec
 Jean-Docile Brousseau (1825 – 1908), Canadian politician and newspaper owner
 Joseph Brousseau (1733–1797), French architect
 Kate Brousseau (1862–1938), American professor and researcher 
 Paul Brousseau (b. 1973), retired professional ice hockey player

See also
 Brosseau

French-language surnames